Zachariah Nicholovos is Metropolitan of Northeast American Diocese of Malankara Orthodox Syrian Church.

References

1959 births
Living people
Malankara Orthodox Syrian Church bishops